Roslino is a rural locality (a village) in Yugskoye Rural Settlement, Cherepovetsky District, Vologda Oblast, Russia. The population was 18 as of 2002. There are 2 streets.

Geography 
Pochinok is the nearest rural locality.

References 

Rural localities in Cherepovetsky District